The 2020 Scottish Open (known for sponsorship reasons as the Matchroom.live Scottish Open) was a professional ranking snooker tournament, that took place on 7–13 December 2020 at the Marshall Arena in Milton Keynes, England. It was the sixth ranking event of the 2020–21 season and the third event of the Home Nations Series.

Mark Selby was the defending champion after a 9–6 defeat of Jack Lisowski in the 2019 final. He successfully defended his title, winning against Ronnie O'Sullivan 9–3. This was Selby's 19th career ranking title, and he became the second player, after Judd Trump, to win three Home Nations Series titles.

Zhou Yuelong made his second career maximum break in the third frame of his first-round match with Peter Lines.

Prize fund
The breakdown of prize money for this year is shown below:

 Winner: £70,000
 Runner-up: £30,000
 Semi-final: £20,000
 Quarter-final: £10,000
 Last 16: £7,500
 Last 32: £4,000
 Last 64: £3,000
 Highest break: £5,000
 Total: £405,000

Tournament draw

Top half

Section 1

Section 2

Section 3

Section 4

Bottom half

Section 5

Section 6

Section 7

Section 8

Finals

Final

Century breaks
A total of 86 century breaks were made by 45 players during the tournament.

 147  Zhou Yuelong
 140, 126  Liam Highfield
 138, 132, 103, 102  Barry Hawkins
 137, 101  Shaun Murphy
 135, 129, 128, 123, 121, 102, 101, 100  Mark Selby
 135, 129, 112, 110, 109, 105  Mark Allen
 135, 126, 114, 114, 103, 101  Ding Junhui
 134, 127, 123  Ronnie O'Sullivan
 134, 127, 113, 100  Kyren Wilson
 134  Lu Ning
 134  Kurt Maflin
 134  Matthew Stevens
 133, 129  Liang Wenbo
 131  Ashley Hugill
 129, 104  Tian Pengfei

 129  Stuart Bingham
 128  Chris Wakelin
 127  Noppon Saengkham
 126, 121, 113, 108, 101  Michael Holt
 126  Zhao Xintong
 124  Jimmy Robertson
 123  Dominic Dale
 123  Zak Surety
 122  Yuan Sijun
 121  Steven Hallworth
 120  Andy Hicks
 117, 113  Ricky Walden
 112  Alan McManus
 110 Michael Collumb
 109  Jak Jones

 108, 106  Mark Joyce
 107  Lyu Haotian
 106  Jackson Page
 105, 100  Jamie Jones
 104, 104, 103  Judd Trump
 104, 100  Mark Williams
 104  Luo Honghao
 103, 100  Robbie Williams
 103  Ali Carter
 102  Jamie Clarke
 102  Jack Lisowski
 102  Si Jiahui
 102  Thepchaiya Un-Nooh
 101, 100  Li Hang
 100  Igor Figueiredo

References

Home Nations Series
2020
Scottish Open
December 2020 sports events in the United Kingdom
Sport in Milton Keynes
Snooker competitions in England